Duduc (or Dudoc) was a medieval Bishop of Wells.

Life 

Dudoc was a native of Lorraine or of Saxony. He was a priest for Cnut before being named Bishop of Wells by Cnut in 1033. He was consecrated 11 June 1033.

King Edward the Confessor sent Dudoc along with two abbots to Rheims in 1049 on a diplomatic mission, where he attended the Council of Reims held by Pope Leo IX.

Dudoc died on 18 January 1060. He left his estates and vestments to his church, but the will was invalidated by King Edward, partly at the request of Archbishop Stigand, who received one of the estates instead.

Citations

References

External links 
 

Bishops of Wells
1060 deaths
Year of birth unknown
11th-century English Roman Catholic bishops